Abdelrahman Abdelhakim Mohamed Hussein (born 8 November 1996) is an Egyptian badminton player. He was the bronze medalist at the 2019 African Games in the men's doubles and team events.

Achievements

African Games 
Men's doubles

African Championships 
Men's doubles

BWF International Challenge/Series (3 titles, 2 runners-up) 
Men's doubles

Mixed doubles

  BWF International Challenge tournament
  BWF International Series tournament
  BWF Future Series tournament

References

External links 
 

1996 births
Living people
Egyptian male badminton players
Badminton players at the 2014 Summer Youth Olympics
Competitors at the 2015 African Games
Competitors at the 2019 African Games
African Games bronze medalists for Egypt
African Games medalists in badminton
21st-century Egyptian people